The Administration of Justice (Language) Act (Ireland) 1737 was passed by the Parliament of Ireland in 1737. The statute was primarily directed at the perceived problem caused by the widespread use of Law French and Latin in courts but has had the effect of excluding autochthonous languages, given that it excludes the use of "any other tongue or language whatsoever".

The Act was controversial among Irish language advocates, due to the fact that in Northern Ireland, a court proceeding could not be carried out in the Irish language. The Act forbade the use of any language but English in court proceedings and all courts in the jurisdiction followed it. The equivalents of this Act passed for England in 1731 and for Wales in 1733 were repealed for both countries in 1863. Northern Ireland was thus the only jurisdiction in the United Kingdom that retained this legislation until 2022.

The New Decade, New Approach agreement, which restored the devolved government in Northern Ireland on 9 January 2020, provided for legislation to amend the Northern Ireland Act 1998 that, among other changes, was repeal of the 1737 act. This Act was repealed by Section 4 of the Identity and Language (Northern Ireland) Act 2022.

See also
Administration of Justice Act

References

External links
Full text of the original Administration of Justice (Language) Act (Ireland) 1737 (c.6).
Revised statute as it currently stands.
Droim láimhe is diúltú glan don Ghaeilge (Total rejection of Irish Gaelic.) 
Judicial Review, 2009.
Mark Durkan, MLA, MP questions the Minister for Justice, Mr David Ford, MLA.
 (Sinn Féin leader Gerry Adams supports the abolition of the Act)
Céim Siar Maidir le Stádas na Gaeilge ó Thuaidh (A blow to the status of the Irish Gaelic Language in the North of Ireland.)

Repealed Irish legislation
Acts of the Parliament of Ireland (pre-1801)
1737 in Ireland
1737 in law
Courts of Ireland before 1922
Courts of Northern Ireland
Language legislation